In the Land of Time and Other Fantasy Tales is a posthumous collection of short stories by the writer Lord Dunsany, in the Penguin Classics series. Edited and with an introduction by S. T. Joshi, it assembles material from across Dunsany's long career. The cover illustration is a colourised version of a classic illustration for an early Dunsany story by his preferred artist, Sidney Sime.

Contents
The collection includes several of Dunsany's most famous stories. It is grouped in themed sections by the editor, and the contents are:
 Introduction (S. T. Joshi)
 Suggestions for Further Reading (S. T. Joshi)
 A Note on the Text (S. T. Joshi)
 Section I: Pegana and Environs
 The Gods of Pegana (entire text)
 Time and the Gods ("The Lament of the Gods for Sardathrion")
 The Legend of the Dawn
 In the Land of Time
 The Relenting of Sarnidac
 The Fall of Babbulkund
 Section II: Tales of Wonder
 The Sword of Welleran
 The Kith of the Elf-Folk
 The Ghosts
 The Fortress Unvanquishable Save for Sacnoth
 Blagdaross
 Idle Days on the Yann
 A Shop in Go-by Street
 The Avenger of Perdóndaris
 The Bride of the Man-Horse
 Section III: Prose Poems
 Where the Tides Ebb and Flow
 The Raft Builders
 The Prayer of the Flowers
 The Workman
 Charon
 Carcassonne
 Roses
 The City
 Section IV: Fantasy and Reality
 The Wonderful Window
 The Coronation of Mr. Thomas Shap
 The City on Mallington Moor
 The Bureau d'Echange de Maux
 The Exiles' Club
 Thirteen at Table
 The Last Dream of Bwona Khubla
 Section V: Jorkens
 The Tale of the Abu Laheeb (the first Jorkens story)
 Our Distant Cousins
 The Walk to Lingham
 The Development of the Rillswood Estate
 A Life's Work
 Section VI: Some Late Tales
 The Policeman's Prophecy
 The Two Bottles of Relish
 The Cut
 Poseidon
 Helping the Fairies
 The Romance of His Life
 The Pirate of the Round Pond
 Explanatory Notes (S. T. Joshi)

References

Sources
 The Locus Index to Science Fiction, 2004

2004 short story collections
Short story collections by Edward Plunkett, 18th Baron of Dunsany